Near miss may refer to:

Near miss (safety), an unplanned event that did not result in injury, illness, or damage - but had the potential to do so
Near-Earth object, an asteroid or meteorite that barely misses the earth or another body
Near-miss Johnson solid, a type of geometric shape
Near Miss (band), an American punk band